Arnold Nkoy Mokomo (born 27 December 1995) is a Democratic Republic of the Congo taekwondo practitioner. He won the bronze medal at the 2015 African Games in the taekwondo men's -74 kg category and one in the same category at the 2018 African Taekwondo Championships.

Medal record

References

1995 births
African Games bronze medalists for DR Congo
Democratic Republic of the Congo taekwondo practitioners
Living people
Competitors at the 2015 African Games
African Games medalists in taekwondo
African Taekwondo Championships medalists
21st-century Democratic Republic of the Congo people